The 1958–59 Greek Football Cup was the 17th edition of the Greek Football Cup. The competition culminated with the Greek Cup Final, held at Leoforos Alexandras Stadium, Athens on 5 July 1959. The match was contested by Olympiacos and Doxa Drama, with Olympiacos winning by 2–1.

Calendar
From Round of 32 onwards:

Knockout phase
In the knockout phase, teams play against each other over a single match. If the match ends up as a draw, extra time will be played and if the match remains a draw a replay match is set at the home of the guest team which the extra time rule stands as well. If a winner doesn't occur after the replay match the winner emerges by a flip of a coin.

Bracket

Round of 16

||colspan="2" rowspan="7" 

|}

*Suspended at the 53rd minute. The replay match was set at the neutral ground, Karaiskakis Stadium

Quarter-finals

||colspan="2" rowspan="3" 

|}

Semi-finals

||colspan="2" 

|}

Final

The 17th Greek Cup Final was played at the Leoforos Alexandras Stadium.

*Greek FA's official site mention Yfantis as the scorer.

References

External links
Greek Cup 1958-59 at RSSSF

Greek Football Cup seasons
Greek Cup
Cup